Oh Hyun-Mi (born ) is a South Korean female volleyball player. She was part of the South Korea women's national volleyball team.

She participated at the 2009 FIVB Women's World Grand Champions Cup. On club level she played for GS Caltex in 2009.

References

External links
 Profile at FIVB.org

1986 births
Living people
South Korean women's volleyball players
Place of birth missing (living people)